Saaremaa Waltz is an Estonian song (schlager) written in 1949 by Raimond Valgre. The words of the song come from the poem Talgud Lööne soos by Debora Vaarandi.

Georg Ots recorded a version in 1950.

The song is popular also in Finland. The Finnish lyrics were written by Ilkka Kortesniemi.

References

External links
Georg Ots is singing the song, ERR.ee

Estonian songs